Ivan James Gibbs (22 November 1927 – 19 May 2011) was an Australian politician.

Politics 
Gibbs was a member of the Legislative Assembly of Queensland, representing the seat of electoral district of Albert for the National Party from 1974 to 1989. He held the Health portfolio in the last days of the Bjelke-Petersen government. He was also Attorney-General.

References

1927 births
2011 deaths
Members of the Queensland Legislative Assembly
National Party of Australia members of the Parliament of Queensland
Attorneys-General of Queensland
People from Whittlesea, Victoria